Heinz Adolf Jörn Wunderlich (born 16 January 1960 in Gladbeck) is a German politician for the Die Linke.
He studied jurisprudence in Berlin and Göttingen. Since 2005 he is a member of the Bundestag.

References

1960 births
Living people
Members of the Bundestag for Saxony
Members of the Bundestag 2013–2017
Members of the Bundestag 2009–2013
Members of the Bundestag 2005–2009
Members of the Bundestag for The Left